Rio Grande Ranger is a 1936 American Western film directed by Spencer Gordon Bennet and starring Robert Allen, Iris Meredith and Paul Sutton.

Partial cast
Robert Allen as Bob Allen aka 'Smoke'  
Iris Meredith as Sandra Cullen  
Paul Sutton as Jim Sayres  
Hal Taliaferro as Ranger Hal Garrick  
Robert 'Buzz' Henry as Buzzy Cullen  
John Elliott as John Cullen  
Tom London as Henchman Sneed  
Slim Whitaker as Henchman Jack  
Jack Rockwell as Ranger Captain Winkler

References

External links

1936 films
1936 Western (genre) films
1930s English-language films
American Western (genre) films
Columbia Pictures films
American black-and-white films
Films scored by Lee Zahler
Films directed by Spencer Gordon Bennet
1930s American films